Parliamentary elections were held in Egypt in May 1936. The result was a victory for the Wafd Party, which won 169 of the 232 seats.

Results

References

Egypt
Elections in Egypt
1936 in Egypt
May 1936 events
Election and referendum articles with incomplete results